Frederick William Schramm (28 March 1886 – 28 October 1962) was a New Zealand politician of the Labour Party. He was the eleventh Speaker of the House of Representatives, from 1944 to 1946.

Biography

Early life
Schramm was born in Hokitika in 1886. His Danish parents had arrived in New Zealand in the 1860s. He received his education at Hokitika High School and at Canterbury College. He was a prominent sports person in his younger years in athletics, cricket, and hockey, and represented Canterbury College in the New Zealand University championships for two years.

He married Alice Amelia Peard in 1918; they had two daughters. Schramm started his professional career as a clerk with the Justice Department and held positions in Wanganui and Te Kuiti before World War I, and Christchurch, Wellington, and Auckland after the war. He then became deputy-registrar and deputy-sheriff of the Auckland Supreme Court but resigned in 1922 to enter private practice. He was a solicitor and barrister for the last nine years before his election to Parliament.

Political career

In 1927 he stood unsuccessfully for the Auckland City Council on a Labour Party ticket. Schramm was a member of the Auckland University College Council until his resignation in 1942.

Originally an ally of John A. Lee, they fell out and Schramm moved for Lee's expulsion at the 1940 Labour conference. Lee supported the National candidate Duncan Rae who defeated Schramm in the  electorate in 1946.

In early 1947 he was a nominee for the Mount Albert by-election but was not selected as the candidate. Soon afterwards Schramm, who was originally from Hokitika, was also speculated as a possible candidate at another by-election in Westland but suggestion of him seeking the candidacy was later dismissed.

In November 1947 he was Labour's candidate for the Auckland mayoralty, placing second behind sitting mayor Sir John Allum. Schramm wished to stand for the mayoralty again in 1950, but was beaten for the Labour nomination by former city councillor John Stewart. In  he stood in Parnell once more and was again defeated. He was then President of the Auckland Labour Representation Committee from 1955 to 1957.

Awards and death
In 1935, Schramm was awarded the King George V Silver Jubilee Medal.

He died in Auckland in 1962 and was buried at Purewa Cemetery.

Notes

References

Who’s Who in New Zealand, 4th Edition 1941
New Zealand Herald 1962, 30 October (death notice)

|-

1886 births
1962 deaths
Speakers of the New Zealand House of Representatives
New Zealand Labour Party MPs
20th-century New Zealand lawyers
New Zealand people of Danish descent
Members of the New Zealand House of Representatives
People from Hokitika
People from Auckland
New Zealand MPs for Auckland electorates
Burials at Purewa Cemetery
Unsuccessful candidates in the 1928 New Zealand general election
Unsuccessful candidates in the 1946 New Zealand general election
Unsuccessful candidates in the 1949 New Zealand general election
People educated at Westland High School, Hokitika